Dual-tone multi-frequency signaling (DTMF) is a telecommunication signaling system using the voice-frequency band over telephone lines between telephone equipment and other communications devices and switching centers. DTMF was first developed in the Bell System in the United States, and became known under the trademark Touch-Tone for use in push-button telephones supplied to telephone customers, starting in 1963.  DTMF is standardized as ITU-T Recommendation Q.23. It is also known in the UK as MF4.

Touch-Tone dialing with a telephone keypad gradually replaced the use of rotary dials and has become the industry standard in telephony. Other multi-frequency systems are also used for signaling on trunks in the telephone network.

Multifrequency signaling
Before the development of DTMF, telephone numbers were dialed by users with a loop-disconnect (LD) signaling, more commonly known as pulse dialing (dial pulse, DP) in the United States. It functions by interrupting the current in the local loop between the telephone exchange and the calling party's telephone at a precise rate with a switch in the telephone that is operated by the rotary dial as it spins back to its rest position after having been rotated to each desired number. The exchange equipment responds to the dial pulses either directly by operating relays or by storing the number in a digit register that records the dialed number. The physical distance for which this type of dialing was possible was restricted by electrical distortions and was possible only on direct metallic links between end points of a line. Placing calls over longer distances required either operator assistance or provision of special subscriber trunk dialing equipment. Operators used an earlier type of multi-frequency signaling.

Multi-frequency signaling (MF) is a group of signaling methods that use a mixture of two pure tone (pure sine wave) sounds. Various MF signaling protocols were devised by the Bell System and CCITT. The earliest of these were for in-band signaling between switching centers, where long-distance telephone operators used a 16-digit keypad to input the next portion of the destination telephone number in order to contact the next downstream long-distance telephone operator. This semi-automated signaling and switching proved successful in both speed and cost effectiveness. Based on this prior success with using MF by specialists to establish long-distance telephone calls, dual-tone multi-frequency signaling was developed for end-user signaling without the assistance of operators.

The DTMF system uses a set of eight audio frequencies transmitted in pairs to represent 16 signals, represented by the ten digits, the letters A to D, and the symbols # and *. As the signals are audible tones in the voice frequency range, they can be transmitted through electrical repeaters and amplifiers, and over radio and microwave links, thus eliminating the need for intermediate operators on long-distance circuits.

AT&T described the product as "a method for pushbutton signaling from customer stations using the voice transmission path." In order to prevent consumer telephones from interfering with the MF-based routing and switching between telephone switching centers, DTMF frequencies differ from all of the pre-existing MF signaling protocols between switching centers: MF/R1, R2, CCS4, CCS5, and others that were later replaced by SS7 digital signaling. DTMF was known throughout the Bell System by the trademark Touch-Tone. The term was first used by AT&T in commerce on July 5, 1960, and was introduced to the public on November 18, 1963, when the first push-button telephone was made available to the public. As a parent company of Bell Systems, AT&T held the trademark from September 4, 1962, to March 13, 1984. It is standardized by ITU-T Recommendation Q.23. In the UK, it is also known as MF4.

Other vendors of compatible telephone equipment called the Touch-Tone feature tone dialing or DTMF. Automatic Electric (GTE) referred to it as "Touch-calling" in their marketing. Other trade names such as Digitone were used by the Northern Electric Company in Canada.

As a method of in-band signaling, DTMF signals were also used by cable television broadcasters as cue tones to indicate the start and stop times of local commercial insertion points during station breaks for the benefit of cable companies. Until out-of-band signaling equipment was developed in the 1990s, fast, unacknowledged DTMF tone sequences could be heard during the commercial breaks of cable channels in the United States and elsewhere. Previously, terrestrial television stations used DTMF tones to control remote transmitters.  In IP telephony, DTMF signals can also be delivered as either in-band or out-of-band tones, or even as a part of signaling protocols, as long as both endpoints agree on a common approach to adopt.

#, *, A, B, C, and D 

The engineers had envisioned telephones being used to access computers and automated response systems. They consulted with companies to determine the requirements. This led to the addition of the number sign (#, ''pound'' or "diamond" in this context, "hash", "square" or "gate" in the UK, and "octothorpe'' by the original engineers) and asterisk or "star" (*) keys as well as a group of keys for menu selection: A, B, C and D. In the end, the lettered keys were dropped from most phones, and it was many years before the two symbol keys became widely used for vertical service codes such as *67 in the United States of America and Canada to suppress caller ID.

Public payphones that accept credit cards use these additional codes to send the information from the magnetic strip.

The AUTOVON telephone system of the United States Armed Forces used these signals to assert certain privilege and priority levels when placing telephone calls.  Precedence is still a feature of military telephone networks, but using number combinations. For example, entering 93 before a number is a priority call.

Present-day uses of the signals A, B, C and D are rare in telephone networks, and are exclusive to network control. For example, key A is used in some networks for cycling through a list of carriers. The signals are used in radio phone patch and repeater operations to allow, among other uses, control of the repeater while connected to an active telephone line.

The signals *, #, A, B, C and D are still widely used worldwide by amateur radio operators and commercial two-way radio systems for equipment control, repeater control, remote-base operations and some telephone communications systems.

DTMF signaling tones can also be heard at the start or end of some prerecorded VHS videocassettes. Information on the master version of the video tape is encoded in the DTMF tone. The encoded tone provides information to automatic duplication machines, such as format, duration and volume levels, in order to replicate the original video as closely as possible.

DTMF tones are used in some caller ID systems to transfer the caller ID information, but in the United States the Bell 202 modulated frequency-shift keying (FSK) signaling is used to transfer the data.

Keypad

The DTMF telephone keypad is laid out as a matrix of push buttons in which each row represents the low  frequency component and each column represents the high frequency component of the DTMF signal. The commonly used keypad has four rows and three columns, but a fourth column is present for some applications. Pressing a key sends a combination of the row and column frequencies. For example, the 1 key produces a superimposition of a 697 Hz low tone and a 1209 Hz high tone. Initial pushbutton designs employed levers, enabling each button to activate one row and one column contact. The tones are decoded by the switching center to determine the keys pressed by the user.

Decoding

DTMF was originally decoded by tuned filter banks. By the end of the 20th century, digital signal processing became the predominant technology for decoding. DTMF decoding algorithms typically use the Goertzel algorithm. As DTMF signaling is often transmitted in-band with voice or other audio signals present simultaneously, the DTMF signal definition includes strict limits for timing (minimum duration and interdigit spacing), frequency deviations, harmonics, and amplitude relation of the two components with respect to each other (twist).

Other multiple frequency signals
National telephone systems define other tones, outside the DTMF specification, that indicate the status of lines, equipment, or the result of calls, and for control of equipment for troubleshooting or service purposes. Such call-progress tones are often also composed of multiple frequencies and are standardized in each country. The Bell System defined them in the Precise Tone Plan. Bell's Multi-frequency signaling was exploited by blue box devices.

Some early modems were based on touch-tone frequencies,
such as Bell 400-style modems.

See also
 Selective calling
 Special information tone
 Cue tone

References

Further reading
 ITU's recommendations for implementing DTMF services
 .
 
 Frank Durda, Dual Tone Multi-Frequency (Touch-Tone®) Reference, 2006.
 ITU-T Recommendation Q.24 - Multifrequency push-button signal reception

Telephony signals
Broadcast engineering